Raúl Lizoain Cruz (born 27 January 1991) is a Spanish professional footballer who plays for FC Andorra as a goalkeeper.

Club career

Las Palmas
Born in Las Palmas, Canary Islands, Lizoain came through the youth ranks of local UD Las Palmas, playing one season with the B team in the Tercera División. He was promoted to the main squad for the 2011–12 campaign.

Lizoain made his official debut with the first team on 26 November 2011, coming off the bench for field player Javier Portillo in a 2–0 Segunda División away loss against SD Huesca. He was mainly used as a backup to Mariano Barbosa in the following years.

After Barbosa's departure to Sevilla FC, Lizoain battled for the first-choice status with new signing Casto. He began the season as a starter, but returned to the bench in December 2014; in May of the following year, after Casto's injury, he retained his place in the starting XI and also appeared in the play-offs.

Lizoain made his debut in La Liga on 22 August 2015, in a 1–0 defeat at Atlético Madrid. On 2 August 2018, after suffering relegation, he terminated his contract.

Alcorcón
On 13 August 2018, Lizoain signed a two-year deal with second division club AD Alcorcón. On 27 August of the following year, after playing second-fiddle to Dani Jiménez, he was released.

Mirandés
Days after his release from Alcorcón, Lizoain signed for Málaga CF, but the transfer was invalidated by the league as his wage was considered above the Andalusian club's limit. He remained without a team until 26 January 2020, when he arrived at CD Mirandés to compete with veteran Limones.

Andorra
On 7 July 2022, free agent Lizoain agreed to a two-year contract at second-tier newcomers FC Andorra.

Personal life
Lizoain is the nephew of blind singer Serafín Zubiri.

References

External links

1991 births
Living people
Spanish footballers
Footballers from Las Palmas
Association football goalkeepers
La Liga players
Segunda División players
Tercera División players
UD Las Palmas Atlético players
UD Las Palmas players
AD Alcorcón footballers
CD Mirandés footballers
FC Andorra players